Cody Gordon Ellis (born 24 April 1990) is an Australian professional basketball player for the Warwick Senators of the NBL1 West. After four years of college basketball for Saint Louis University, Ellis had a five-year stint in the NBL with the Sydney Kings and Illawarra Hawks.

Early life and career
Ellis was born and raised in Perth, Western Australia. In 2008 and 2009, he attended the Australian Institute of Sport in Canberra and played for the program's SEABL team. He was also a member of the Under 19 Australian Emus team that finished fourth at the 2009 FIBA Under-19 World Championship.

College career
Ellis moved to the United States for the 2009–10 college season to play for the Saint Louis Billikens. He missed the first 14 games of the season before being cleared by the NCAA and joined the team in January 2010. He played in 22 games with 19 starts and averaged 10.5 points and 4.9 rebounds per game. He subsequently earned Atlantic 10 All-Rookie Team honours.

As a sophomore in 2010–11, Ellis played in 21 games for the Billikens before suffering a season-ending dislocated shoulder in February 2011. For the season, he averaged 6.5 points and 3.7 rebounds per game.

As a junior in 2011–12, Ellis managed his first full season while serving as a key sixth man for the Billikens, appearing in every game (34) and coming off the bench in all but one. He averaged 10.1 points per game and led the team with 69 three-pointers made, which tied for the eighth most in a single season at SLU.

As a senior in 2012–13, Ellis earned Atlantic 10 Sixth Man of the Year honours. He appeared in all 35 games off the bench, averaging 10.1 points and 3.5 rebounds per game. He led the team with 62 three-point field goals and was seventh in the A-10 with a .829 free-throw percentage.

Ellis ended his career at SLU as one of 27 1,000-point scorers (1,062) in school history, and ranked sixth all-time at SLU in three-pointers made (194) and fourth in attempts (580).

Professional career

NBL

Sydney Kings (2013–2015)
On 13 July 2013, Ellis signed a two-year deal with the Sydney Kings of the National Basketball League. However, his arrival in Sydney was delayed until December 2013 while he completed his studies in business at Saint Louis. He made his debut for the Kings on 3 January 2014 against the Cairns Taipans, and in 16 games during the 2013–14 NBL season, Ellis averaged 5.1 points and 3.1 rebounds per game.

On 25 March 2014, the Kings took up the second-year option on Ellis two-year contract, re-signing him for the 2014–15 season. He scored a career-high 18 points on 17 January 2015 in an 80–76 loss to the Cairns Taipans. He appeared in all 28 games for the Kings in 2014–15, averaging 6.9 points and 3.4 rebounds per game.

Illawarra Hawks (2015–2018)
On 10 August 2015, Ellis signed with the Illawarra Hawks for the 2015–16 NBL season. On 17 January 2016, he scored 18 points in the Hawks' 103–96 double-overtime win over the New Zealand Breakers. In 29 games for the Hawks in 2015–16, Ellis averaged 6.0 points, 2.6 rebounds and 1.1 assists per game.

On 20 April 2016, Ellis re-signed with the Hawks on a two-year deal. He helped the Hawks reach the 2017 NBL Grand Final, where they faced the Perth Wildcats. In game one of the series, Ellis scored a team- and season-high 12 points in an 89–77 loss. The Hawks went on to lose the best-of-five series in three games. Ellis appeared in all 34 games for the Hawks in 2016–17, averaging 4.6 points, 1.5 rebounds and 1.1 assists per game.

Ellis entered the 2017–18 NBL season eight kilos lighter. However, a bout of chicken pox kept him out of the NBL pre-season blitz. Ellis started the 2017–18 season out of the rotation after management at the Hawks sent down the edict to the coaching staff that he wasn't to play. Eventually he hit the floor and finished the season strongly. In 20 games for the Hawks in 2017–18, he averaged 6.7 points, 1.4 rebounds and 1.0 assists per game.

In September 2018, Ellis joined the Cairns Taipans as a pre-season injury replacement for Lucas Walker.

SBL

Stirling/Warwick Senators (2014–present)
Every year since 2014, Ellis has played in the State Basketball League (SBL) for the Warwick Senators. Known as the Stirling Senators when he first joined the club, Ellis played in the SBL during the NBL off-seasons before continuing in the league following his NBL tenure.

Ellis' first three seasons in the SBL saw him average over 22 points per game. With the league's change from 48-minute games to 40-minute games in 2017, his scoring average dropped to 17 per game, which then dropped to 14.5 and 13.4 in 2018 and 2019 respectively.

Due to the COVID-19 pandemic, the 2020 SBL season was cancelled. Ellis later joined the Senators in July 2020 for the West Coast Classic. He helped Warwick reach the grand final of the West Coast Classic, where they defeated the Perry Lakes Hawks 96–81 to earn the Senators their first ever title. In 13 games, he averaged 14.69 points, 4.62 rebounds and 5.08 assists per game.

In December 2020, Ellis re-signed with the Senators for the 2021 NBL1 West season. In 23 games, he averaged 17.17 points, 5.65 rebounds, 4.47 assists and 1.82 steals per game.

In December 2021, Ellis re-signed with the Senators for the 2022 NBL1 West season. He was limited to 15 games in 2022 due to a knee injury, averaging 18.2 points, 5.0 rebounds, 3.07 assists, 1.27 steals and 1.07 blocks per game.

In January 2023, Ellis re-signed with the Senators for the 2023 NBL1 West season.

National team career
In June 2013, Ellis was selected in the Australian squad for the Stanković Cup in China and the Universiade in Russia, where he won gold and silver respectively.

Personal
Ellis is the son of retired Perth Wildcats legend, Mike Ellis. Ellis and his wife, Lauren, have a son.

References

External links

Illawarra Hawks player profile
Saint Louis player bio
Cody and Mike Ellis talk basketball and the NBL
Mike Ellis proud of son but bewildered no NBL spot for Cody

1990 births
Living people
Australian men's basketball players
Australian expatriate basketball people in the United States
Australian Institute of Sport basketball players
Illawarra Hawks players
Power forwards (basketball)
Saint Louis Billikens men's basketball players
Sydney Kings players
Universiade medalists in basketball
Universiade silver medalists for Australia
Medalists at the 2013 Summer Universiade